Never a Dull Moment is a 1942  thriller novel by the British writer Peter Cheyney. It is the eight in his series of novels featuring the FBI agent Lemmy Caution. Cheyney had become known for his hardboiled style, similar to that of Raymond Chandler.

Synopsis
When an American woman is kidnapped and taken to England, supposedly by two mobsters, Lemmy Caution is hot on their trail. Soon it appears there is more to the kidnapping than at first meets the eye.

References

Bibliography
 James, Russell. Great British Fictional Detectives. Remember When, 21 Apr 2009.
 Pitts, Michael R. Famous Movie Detectives. Scarecrow Press, 1979.
 Reilly, John M. Twentieth Century Crime & Mystery Writers. Springer, 2015.
 Server, Lee. Encyclopedia of Pulp Fiction Writers. Infobase Publishing, 2014.

1942 British novels
Novels by Peter Cheyney
British thriller novels
Novels set in London
British crime novels
William Collins, Sons books